The Tragedy of Youth is a 1928 American silent drama film directed by George Archainbaud and starring Patsy Ruth Miller, Warner Baxter and William Collier Jr. It was produced and released by Tiffany Pictures, one of the largest independent studios in Hollywood during the era.

Synopsis
A newlywed wife feels neglected by her husband and turns to another man for consolation.

Cast
 Patsy Ruth Miller as Paula Wayne
 Warner Baxter as Frank Gordon
 William Collier Jr. as 	Dick Wayne 
 Claire McDowell as 	Mother
 Harvey Clark as Father 
 Margaret Quimby as 	Diana
 Billie Bennett as 	Landlady
 Stepin Fetchit as 	Porter

References

Bibliography
 Munden, Kenneth White. The American Film Institute Catalog of Motion Pictures Produced in the United States, Part 1. University of California Press, 1997.

External links

 

1928 films
1928 drama films
1920s English-language films
American silent feature films
American drama films
American black-and-white films
Films directed by George Archainbaud
Tiffany Pictures films
1920s American films
Silent American drama films